The knotty pebblesnail, scientific name Somatogyrus constrictus, of minute freshwater snails with an operculum, aquatic gastropod molluscs or micromolluscs in the family Hydrobiidae.  The taxonomic validity of this species has been questioned; it may represent morphological aberrations of other, valid species.  If it is a valid species, it would be assessed as threatened.

References

Endemic fauna of the United States
Molluscs of the United States
Somatogyrus
Freshwater snails
Gastropods described in 1904
Taxonomy articles created by Polbot